The Singh Sabha Movement was a Sikh movement that began in Punjab in the 1870s in reaction to the proselytising activities of Christians, Hindu reform movements (Brahmo Samajis, Arya Samaj) and Muslims (Aligarh movement and Ahmadiyah). The movement was founded in an era when the Sikh Empire had been dissolved and annexed by the British, the Khalsa had lost its prestige, and mainstream Sikhs were rapidly converting to other religions. The movement's aims were to "propagate the true Sikh religion and restore Sikhism to its pristine glory; to write and distribute historical and religious books of Sikhs; and to propagate Gurmukhi Punjabi through magazines and media." The movement sought to reform Sikhism and bring back into the Sikh fold the apostates who had converted to other religions; as well as to interest the influential British officials in furthering the Sikh community. At the time of its founding, the Singh Sabha policy was to avoid criticism of other religions and political matters.

Background
Increased Mughal persecution of the Sikhs in the eighteenth century forced the Khalsa, which had raised arms against the state, to yield Gurdwara control to mahants, or custodians, who often belonged to Udasi, Nirmala, or other Brahmanical-influenced ascetic heterodox sects, or were non-Sikh altogether due to their lack of external identification, as opposed to initiated Sikhs. The Khalsa at this time engaged in guerilla campaigns against the Mughals and the hill-rajas of the Sivalik Hills allied to them; having vacated the Punjab plains, they launched attacks from the refuges of the northern hilly areas adjoining Punjab, and the desert areas to the south. They later fought the Afghans and established themselves as local leaders, while mahant control of Gurdwaras continued into the nineteenth century, particularly "pujari" priestly class under the patronage of Sikh elites and aristocracy. Such groups wrote exegeses while the Khalsa focused on political power at the time, as Sikh jathas solidified into the Sikh misls of the Dal Khalsa, which would establish the Sikh Empire, which, in the midst of reaching new levels of political power in the face of Mughal and Afghan attacks, came at the expense of reestablishing direct control over Sikh institutions and the eroding of Sikh mores, a development that Khalsa would have to contend with when the Sikh Empire was lost to the British.

The British East India Company annexed the Sikh Empire in 1849 after the Second Anglo-Sikh War. Thereafter, Christian missionaries increased proselytising activities in central Punjab. In 1853, Maharajah Dalip Singh, the last Sikh ruler, was controversially converted to Christianity. In parallel, Brahmo Samaji and Arya Samaji reform movements of Hinduism began active pursuit of Sikhs into their suddhi ceremonies. Muslim proselytizers formed the Anjuman-i-Islamia midst the Sikhs in Lahore, while the Ahmadiyah movement sought converts to their faith. The British colonial rulers, after annexing the Sikh empire in mid-19th-century, continue to patronize and gift land grants to these mahants, thereby increasing their strength and helped sustain the idolatry in Sikh shrines.

The annexation of the Punjab to the British Empire in the mid-19th century saw severe deterioration of Gurdwara management. The British sought to cosset and control the Sikhs through the management of the Golden Temple and its functionaries, even ignoring its own dictates of statutory law which required the separation of secular and religious matters, neutrality in the treatment of religious communities and the withdrawal from involvement in religious institutions; the need to control the Golden Temple was held to be more paramount, and along with control of Sikh institutions, there were measures put in place like the legal ban of carrying weapons, meant to disarm the Khalsa, who had fought against them in the two Anglo Sikh Wars.

In this way the Khalsa army was disbanded and the Punjab demilitarized, and Sikh armies were required to publicly surrender their arms and return to agriculture or other pursuits. Certain groups, however, like those who held revenue-free lands (jagirdars) were allowed to decline, particularly if they were seen as “rebels,” The British were wary of giving the Sikhs unmitigated control of their own gurdwaras, and drew from Sikh factions seen as loyal to the British, like the Sikh aristocracy and Sikhs with noted family lineages, who were given patronage and pensions, and Udasis, who had gained control of historical gurdwaras in the eighteenth and early nineteenth centuries, were allowed to retain proprietary control over lands and gurdwara buildings. The British administration went to considerable lengths to insert such loyalists into the Golden Temple in order to exert as much control over the Sikh body-politic as possible. One reason for this was the emergence of Sikh revivalist groups, like the Nirankaris, the Namdharis, and the Singh Sabha movement, shortly after annexation; this revivalism was spurred by a growing disaffection within the ranks of ordinary Sikhs about the perceived decline of proper Sikh practices.

Sikh institutions deteriorated further under the administration of the mahants, supported by the British, who in addition to being considered as ignoring the needs of the Sikh community of the time, allowed the gurdwaras to turn into spaces for societal undesirables like petty thieves, drunks, pimps, and peddlers of unsavory and licentious music and literature, with which they themselves took part in such activities. In addition, they also allowed non-Sikh, Brahmanical practices to take root in the gurdwaras, including idol worship, caste discrimination, and allowing non-Sikh pandits and astrologers to frequent them, and began to simply ignore the needs of the general Sikh community, as they used gurdwara offerings and other donations as their personal revenue, and their positions became increasingly corrupt and hereditary. Some local congregations marshalled popular pressure against them and to relinquish control, but the large revenue derived from gurdwara estates empowered them to resist such pressure.

Foundation and growth 
The first Singh Sabha was founded in 1873 in Amritsar as a response to what were identified as three main threats: 
Christian missionary activity, who sought to convert more Sikhs into Christians,
the “reverse-proselytizing” of the Arya Samaj with their Shuddhi ("purification") campaigns, which were part of the rising tide of Hindu nationalist consciousness fomenting in the country, and 
the possibility of losing British patronage of Sikhs in general due to the rebellious actions of groups like the Namdhari Sikhs

In parallel to Singh Sabha, in 1869 Punjabi Muslims organized themselves with the Anjuman-i-Islamia. Similarly, the Brahmo Samaj, a Hindu reform movement composed of English-speaking Bengalis then served as the lower rung of the British administration in Punjab had set up branches in several Punjabi cities in the 1860s. These socio-religious organizations also motivated the formation of the Singh Sabha. The Arya Samaj movement, founded by Dayanand Saraswati, a Brahmin from Gujarat, arrived in Punjab in 1877, and promoted the use of Hindi as the medium of education. Attracting newly educated sections of the colonial Hindu populace in particular, it espoused a "purified," rationalistic, codified Hinduism, based on a "Vedic Golden Age" upon which to model Hindu society, conceived by selectively reinterpreting cultural traditions while retaining some post-Vedic thought. It rejected as degenerate accretions contemporary Hindu practices like polytheism, idol and avatar worship, temple offerings, pilgrimages, the widow remarriage prohibition, child marriage, sati, and the priestcraft of Brahmins, considered to have misled the masses through introducing such deviations. These repudiations were in accord with Sikh tradition, and many young Sikh reformists had initially coordinated with them to counteract the growing influence of the Christian missionaries.

Primarily focused on proselytization, and noting Christian missionary success in proselytizing to lower castes, the militant Samajis developed their own conversion ritual, a novelty in Hindu tradition, called shuddhi, to convert Muslims or Christians and to "purify" the untouchable castes into Hinduism, who traditionally had been denied access to Hindu texts by the priestly class. A shuddhi conversion ceremony of outcaste Sikhs was decried by the Sikh community, who condemned such efforts to convert Sikhs to Hinduism in protest meetings. Another religious innovation of the Arya Samaj was the nationalistic idea of a nationwide Hinduism, as opposed to a myriad of different dharmas previously always qualified by subregion or type, which was besieged by, and opposed to, both foreign interference and "unreformed Brahmanical hierarchies," establishing the organization as an important factor in the development of Hindu religious nationalism.

Following the founding and spread of its educational movement in Punjab and beyond in 1883, its publications assailed other faiths, including Christianity, Islam, Jainism, Buddhism, and Sikhism, exacerbating entrenched communal faultlines. With increasingly radicalized dogmatism, anti-Sikhism propaganda continued to be published in the Arya Samaj press through the 1880s, further aggravating relations with the Sikhs, and culminated in an article written in 1888 titled Sikhism Past and Present, which ridiculed Guru Nanak and denigrated Sikhism. Continued public antagonism towards Sikhism by Arya Samajis leading up to the Lahore anniversary celebration in November 1888 would result in the eventual end of Sikh support for them, replacing an earlier perception of shared goals.

Its criticism of both modern Hinduism and Sikhism as polytheistic corruption (including instances of Arya members smashing and trampling idols in other Hindu temples, and Dayanand writing in 1883 that "while it was true that [Sikhs] do not practise idolatry," he saw the Sikh reverence of the Guru Granth Sahib as tantamount to such) treatment of Sikhs as a Hindu sect, and attempts to "purify" Sikhs back to what Arya Samaj called as the "monotheistic Vedic Hinduism" based solely on the infallibility of the Vedas infuriated many and had a major impact in Punjab.

Amritsar Singh Sabha

This first Singh Sabha – called the Amritsar Singh Sabha – was set up and backed by a faction of Khatri Sanatan Sikhs, Gianis, and granthis many of whom where direct descendants of the early Sikh Gurus. They had rejected the Khalsa initiation practices like the Khande di Pahul ceremony on the grounds that it threatened their caste and polluted their ritual boundaries which they considered as primary. They considered themselves as Sanatan Sikhs, and had gained social prominence in the pre-British 18th- and colonial-era 19th-century Punjab by taking over Gurdwaras and Sikh institutions, while Khalsa warriors confronted the Mughal state and Afghan forces for the survival of the Sikh community. While the Sanatan faction resented the democratic tendency within the Khalsa groups, they continued to co-exist within the broader Sikh panth, even as they remained aloof from the mainstream Khalsa practices. The Sanatan Sikhs considered Guru Nanak to be an incarnation or avatar of the Hindu deity Vishnu, and saw Sikhism as a tradition aligned with Vaishnavism (Vishnu-based tradition of Hinduism) and these included the Nirmala, Udasi, and Giani schools of Sanatan thought. As such, they aligned Sikh tradition with the Brahmanical social structure and caste ideology; their predominant concern was to protect the social framework in which they held status. For these groups the principle of authority of Sikh tradition was invested in living gurus (as Khem Singh Bedi, leader of the Sanatan Sikhs, liked to be regarded) rather than the principle of shabad-guru, or the Guru Granth Sahib as the Guru, which was upheld by the dominant Khalsa tradition.

Lahore Singh Sabha

Shortly thereafter, Nihang Sikhs began influencing the movement, followed by a sustained campaign by Tat Khalsa. The Sanatan Sikh was opposed by these predominant groups in the Panth, particularly those who held Khalsa beliefs, who through access to education and employment, had reached a position to challenge the Sanatan faction, forming the Tat Khalsa faction, or "true Khalsa," in 1879, headed by Gurmukh Singh, Harsha Singh Arora, Jawahir Singh and Giani Ditt Singh. They formed the Lahore Singh Sabha. The Tat Khalsa's monotheism, iconoclastic sentiments, egalitarian social values and notion of a standardized Sikh identity did not blend well with the polytheism, idol worship, caste distinctions, and diversity of rites espoused by the Sanatan faction. The Tat Khalsa met with immediately successful organizational and ideological challenging of the Sanatan faction as early as the early 1880s.

Other Singh Sabhas
After the Lahore Singh Sabha, many other Singh Sabhas were formed in every town and many villages throughout Punjab, exceeding over 100 in number by the end of the 19th century, modeling themselves on either the Tat Khalsa or Sanatan factions. Of these, the rivalry of the Lahore and the Amritsar factions was more intense. Despite this, Sikh public leaders formed a central committee and a General Sabha in 1880. On April 11, 1883, this General Sabha evolved into Khalsa Diwan Amritsar, with about 37 affiliated local Singh Sabha chapters, according to Gurdarshan Singh. Other Singh Sabhas, however, opposed it and there were also internal dissensions. The Singh Sabha chapters could not agree on its constitution or its leadership structure, ultimately leading to a split into Khalsa Diwan Amritsar with about 7 chapters and Khalsa Diwan Lahore with about 30 chapters. Each had "greatly different" constitution, in nature and composition, states Gurdarshan Singh.

In its first of several defeats, the Sanatan faction proposed renaming the Singh Sabha to the Sikh Singh Sabha in 1883, as he perceived that the Singh Sabha had already become synonymous with the Khalsa Sikhs, and wanted to attract other minor Sikh sects to the organization. The opposition to this initiative was so overwhelming that Khem Singh Bedi was forced to drop it in the next meeting of the Diwan in April 1884.

The issue of Sikh identity was further sharpened by vociferous Arya Samaj attacks on the Sikh faith, issuing pamphlets claiming Sikhism as a reformist strain within Hinduism. In response, Kahn Singh Nabha published his classic tract Ham Hindu Nahin, which made the case for a distinct Sikh identity. Arya Samaj polemicists continued their attacks on the Sikh religion and made further attempts to incorporate it within the Hindu fold. The Sikh reform movement of the 1880s rejected this "inclusivistic" tendencies of the Arya Samaj, stating that Sikhism was an "exclusive" religion. Nevertheless, a section of Sahajdari Sikh leaders continued to press for inclusiveness, with them declaring they were Hindus in 1897 before a large public gathering to mark the diamond jubilee of Queen Victoria in Lahore. The Lahore Singh Sabha was more successful eventually, representing the Tat Khalsa faction.

Between the 1870s and 1890s, the efforts of Tat Khalsa reformers had focused on reinforcing the distinct Sikh identity separate from Muslim and Hindu practices, the primacy of the Khalsa initiation and codes of conduct, and setting up schools and colleges in town and villages, initiatives that continued through the following CKD period. Through print media newspapers and publications, like the Khalsa Akhbar (in Gurmukhi Punjabi) and The Khalsa (in English), the Singh Sabha solidified a general consensus of the nature of Sikh identity, and that the source of authentic Sikhi was the early Sikh tradition, specifically the period of the Sikh Gurus and immediately after. The Adi Granth was held to be the authoritative Sikh literature, along with compositions by Guru Gobind Singh, the works of Bhai Gurdas, the janamsakhis, and Gurbilas literature and the Rahitnamas, later codified by the SGPC as the Sikh Rehat Maryada. Non-Sikh practices accumulated during the period of institutional neglect by the British and mahant control, including idol worship, the primacy of non-Sikh Brahmins, caste discrimination, superstitious cults of folk heroes and Hindu deities, and Vedic rites officiated by Brahmins during the mahant period, were banished, and Sikh rites and symbols including the Khalsa initiation, the names “Singh and “Kaur,” the 5 Ks, Sikh birth, death, and marriage rites, and the compulsory learning of Gurmukhi and Punjabi in Khalsa schools, an institution found in modern Gurdwaras worldwide, were formalized.

20th century

Chief Khalsa Diwan
In the 1890s, Sikhs groups formed many Khalsa Diwans in towns and cities, while rural groups formed their own Sikh Sabhas. By 1902, there were over 150 Singh Sabhas and Khalsa diwans in existence. Another attempt brought 29 of these Khalsa Diwans and other Sikh societies under the Chief Khalsa Diwan, or CKD, partly due to the need for greater political coordination in the face a far more powerful common adversary, the Arya Samaj, the main representative of political Hinduism in Punjab. This, and the nature and character of the Singh Sabha's modernizing zeal was largely a response to the transformation of the original term Hindu which meant "non-Muslim inhabitants of India" to a term that embodied those who identify with Hinduism. The Chief Khalsa Diwan sought to coordinate a political response and protect the Sikh identity from being viewed as "tiny sect within a broader pan-Hinduism", states Mandair. This body would be created in 1902 to unite the Lahore and Amritsar Singh Sabhas with their respective satellite Singh Sabhas, and would act as the main voice of the Sikhs for the next 18 years.

According to J.S. Grewal, while there were disagreements, the Singh Sabhas and Diwans were all concerned with religious reform and to collectively addressing the growing threat from Christian missionaries who were converting Sikhs into Christians, after the much-publicized celebrity conversions earlier such as of Maharaja Dalip Singh and Kanwar Harnam Singh Ahluwalia. Sikh publications by the various Sikh Sabhas expressed their fear for the Sikh identity in early 20th-century given the success of the Christian missionaries, as well the rising threat of Muslim and Arya Samaj proselytization efforts. The Sikh leaders were concerned about Christian missionary schools targeting the Sikh youth. They welcomed the English language education but opposed the Christian theology that was also being taught in these schools.

The Chief Khalsa Diwan was officially registered and recognized by the colonial British government on July 9, 1904. The new body was financially supported by the affiliated Singh Sabhas, and Sikh aristocrats. It also attracted dedicated Sikh preachers or Updeshak. By 1920, the Chief Khalsa Diwan oversaw 105 affiliates. It developed an elaborate structure with the Chief Khalsa Diwan having three types of advisors and various committees, all paid a monthly salary from dues collected from the affiliates and members. While Sikh newspapers championed the Chief Khalsa Diwan and the British colonial government recognized it as representing the entire Sikh community and all the Sikh Sabhas, in late 1900s and throughout 1910s significant internal disagreements led important Sikh activists to challenge the authority of the Chief Diwan Khalsa. The Amritsar faction, who still exerted administrative dominance amid growing Tat Khalsa strength and growing unease for its conservative stance, were concerned with staying on good terms with the British, who anxiously wanted to uphold the validity of their settlement instated at the beginning of their administration of the Punjab in 1849, in which ownership of Gurdwaras was conferred upon whoever could claim it. In late 1920, Sikh revolutionaries, irritated at the loyal obedience of the CKD to the British, would announce two decisions at the Akal Takht reached by the newly formed Central Sikh League: the formation of the SGPC to manage all Sikh shrines, and the formation of the Akali Dal. The CKD would be overtaken by the more activist Akali movement, led by the Akali Dal, which would train men to confront the government and reclaim gurdwaras.

Akali movement

In the early decades of the 20th century, the Tat Khalsa, through the Akali movement, also contributed to two major legal victories, the 1909 Anand Marriage Act, and the Sikh Gurdwaras Act, 1925, which re-established direct Khalsa control of the major historical gurdwaras, previously run by British-supported mahants and pujaris, or Hindu priests, and their rites. The reestablishment of Sikh control of Gurdwaras, after the non-violent Akali Movement, also known as the Gurdwara Reform Movement, was touched off in 1920 following General Reginald Dyer’s invited visit to the Golden Temple failed to pacify the Sikhs. The Akali Movement, lasting from 1920 to 1925, culminated in the transfer of gurdwara control to the Shiromani Gurdwara Parbandhak Committee (SGPC); the Akali Movement is the forerunner of the modern Akali Dal political party. In 1919, the internal disagreements led some Sikh leaders to form the Central Sikh League, while in 1920 the Shiromani Gurdwara Prabandhak Committee, or SGPC, emerged for the same reasons.

In 1932, a general meeting of the Sikhs formed the Khalsa Darbar as an attempt to form a united front triggered by the colonial British government's Communal Award of seats to the Punjab Legislative Council. The Central Sikh League formed in 1919 merged into the Khalsa Darbar. However, in 1937, the Sikhs split into Shiromani Akali Dal and Congressite Sikhs. The Singh Sabhas of the late 19th-century were overwhelmed by these organizations as Britain attempted to gain Indian soldiers for their World War II efforts and from the dynamics of religion-based political partition of the Indian subcontinent in the final decades of colonial rule. The SGPC, as a democratic institution, has represents the majority opinion of Sikhs, and is the authoritative voice of the Sikhs.

Perspectives
According to Harjot Oberoi, the first Singh Sabha formed in 1873 aimed at interreligious tolerance and cooperation between Sikhs and Hindus. With the arrival of Arya Samaj in 1877 and its criticism of Sikhism, the dynamics changed. According to the Indologist T.N. Madan, Sikhs and Hindus not only lived together before 1870s, they shared a common cultural life with common symbols and orientations. The Arya Samaj activity and the Singh Sabha movement's response to it created several competing definitions of Sikh identity. After the early struggles within the Singh Sabha movement, new social and cultural elites emerged. These, states Oberoi, displaced preceding Sikh ties, replaced them with a "series of inventions: the demarcation of Sikh sacred space by clearing holy shrines of Hindu icons and idols, the cultivation of Punjabi as the sacred language of the Sikhs, the foundation of cultural bodies exclusively for Sikh youth, the insertion of the anniversaries of the Sikh Gurus into the ritual and sacred calendar and most important of all, the introduction of new life-cycle rituals".

Harnik Deol states that Oberoi's analysis may be termed as the "hegemony approach," which seeks to explain how the rising middle class used religious reform to gain cultural hegemony by gaining control over sacred centres and by defining a uniform, undifferentiated religious discourse with discrete boundaries. According to Oberoi, this new class of leadership provided the Sikhs with a distinct and separate Sikh identity with a standardized history, rites of passage, sacred space and observances, though he fails to explain what was new about this message or innovative about the Sikh initiation ritual, as "iconoclastic monotheism and egalitarian social values" had been the exact teachings of the Sikh gurus. This is only a partial understanding of the impact of the Singh Sabha movement, done by stripping the Sikh initiation of its deeper, symbolic significance, and reducing it "merely to its overt function as an ethnic marker," and Deol considers Oberoi's analysis to contradict his own earlier observations, as he himself states that the Khalsa had already established their distinct rites of passage, birth, death and initiation by the 18th century. In reference to the religious and moral codes a true Khalsa must follow that were established by Guru Gobind Singh, it is the rigor and difficulty in living up to these codes, says Deol, that is the reason why only a small fractional percentage of Sikhs undergo the initiation rite even today.

According to Pashaura Singh, while some Sikhs embraced Hindu practices in the 19th century, "it is questionable whether this was always so," and "to imply that Sikh identity was always predominantly fluid, with free mixing of Sikh and Hindu practices," is questionable. From as early as the period of Guru Arjan, Sikhs "clearly were encouraged to think of themselves as a new community." The Singh Sabha movement had many shades of views. The Amritsar Singh Sabha's Khem Singh Bedi saw Sikh identity as distinct, the need for a living guru, supported the idea of divine incarnations (avatars of Hinduism) and the idea that "Hindus and Sikhs were indivisible" as a society. The Lahore Singh Sabha's Gurmukh Singh held the middle ground stating that Sikhs had their own distinct scripture and practices, the issue of Sikh-Hindu relationship was redundant, and that all those who accepted Sikh scripture were Sikhs whether they undergo Khalsa initiation and live by its religious code or those who do not undergo initiation and do not follow some of the Sikh religious and moral codes. The Bhasaur Singh Sabha's Teja Singh represented the more radical view during this movement with the view that those who have not undergone Khalsa initiation should have "no place in the Sikh panth", and to speak of Hindu-Sikh relationship is to insult Sikhism. Eventually, the middle ground view of Gurmukh Singh prevailed.

According to W. H. McLeod, the Singh Sabha "systematized and clarified" the Khalsa tradition, but Khalsa identity was neither a totally new invention, nor mere purging of "alien excrescence," nor the "restoration of a corrupted original.' The Khalsa identity of the Singh Sabha reformers contained both "old and new" elements, quotes Pashaura Singh.

Bibliography

References

Sikh politics
1873 establishments in India